Kirkstone may refer to:

Places
Kirkstone Pass, in Cumbria
Kirkstone House School, in Lincolnshire

Fictional characters
Kit Kirkstone, a character in Cue for Treason
Mirian Kirkstone, a character in The River's End (film)

See also 
Kirkston, a heritage-listed villa in Windsor, Queensland